Mariyam Shifa (22 November 1999) is a Maldivian film actress.

Early life
Shifa attributed her singing and dancing skills to her parents; her father being a prominent boduberu player and her mother being a singer, played a huge role in accomplishing her "dream of becoming an actor". Naming Aishath Rishmy, Nuzuhath Shuaib and Ali Seezan as her inspirations, Shifa grew up in a cinema-friendly environment.

Career
In 2018, at the age of seventeen, Shifa made her career debut with the suspense thriller film Dhevansoora (2018) written and directed by Yoosuf Shafeeu. Revolving around a murder investigation, she played an imaginary doctor counselling the character played by Shafeeu; a man suffering from dissociative identity disorder. The film received positive reviews from critics and was considered a "norm-breaker" for the Maldivian cinema. Reviewing from Raajje.mv, Ismail Naail Nasheed considered her performance to be "good" despite being a newcomer though he noted that she "needs to polish her dialogue delivery in specific scenes which requires extreme emotion". The following year, she played a small role in the Moomin Fuad-directed psychological horror thriller Nivairoalhi (2019) as a victim who get murdered by a religious extremist. Starring opposite Niuma Mohamed, Yoosuf Shafeeu and Ahmed Asim, the film received majorly positive reviews from critics; Aishath Maaha of Dho? favored the performance of the actors and mentioned the "neat arrangement" of its screenplay though pointed out its "weak ending" to be unsatisfactory. She next starred in Yoosuf Shafeeu's horror comedy film 40+ (2019), a sequel to 2017 released comedy film Naughty 40, which was well received both critically and commercially. Besides, she also played the role of Mizna, a straightforward simple girl who is concerned about her married life, in Mohamed Manik-directed psychological web series Haasaa.

In 2020, she collaborated with Moomin Fuad for his period drama web television series Gamini.

Filmography

Feature film

Television

Short film

References 

Living people
People from Malé
21st-century Maldivian actresses
Maldivian film actresses
1999 births